Old Cambus is a village in the Scottish Borders, Scotland. St. Helens church, which is now a ruin served the area.

References

Villages in the Scottish Borders